Archaeopilocornus is a genus of moths of the family Erebidae. It contains only one species, Archaeopilocornus lucidus, which is found in Botswana, Eswatini, Mozambique, South Africa, Tanzania and Zimbabwe.

References

Catocalini
Monotypic moth genera
Moths described in 1968
Moths of Africa